Coláiste Feirste is the only secondary-level Irish-medium school in Belfast, Northern Ireland.

Founded in 1991 with just nine pupils, as of 2022 the school had around 850 pupils and 65 teachers.

The school was first situated in Cultúrlann McAdam Ó Fiaich and was opened under the care of the first school principal Fergus O'Hare who was replaced in 2002 by Garaí Mac Roibeaird as principal. Mícheal Mac Giolla Ghunna has been principal since 2019. The school is now situated in Beechmount, the former home of the Riddel family.

Notable former pupils 
 Niall Ó Donnghaile -  Former Lord Mayor of Belfast and current Sinn Féin Senator in Seanad Éireann.
 Aisling Reilly - Two time singles World Handball Champion and current Sinn Féin MLA for West Belfast.
 Mo Chara - Rapper in the Belfast-based hip hop trio Kneecap
 Conor MacNeill - Actor/writer

See also 
 List of secondary schools in Belfast

References

External links
 

Secondary schools in Belfast
Irish-language schools and college
1991 establishments in Northern Ireland
Educational institutions established in 1991